Proleptus is a genus of nematodes belonging to the family Physalopteridae.

The genus has almost cosmopolitan distribution.

Species:

Proleptus acutus 
Proleptus anabantis 
Proleptus australis 
Proleptus carvajali 
Proleptus coronatus 
Proleptus elegans 
Proleptus gordioides 
Proleptus inflatus 
Proleptus mackenziei 
Proleptus malayi 
Proleptus minutus 
Proleptus niedmanni 
Proleptus obtusus 
Proleptus problematicus 
Proleptus rajae 
Proleptus robustus 
Proleptus soridus 
Proleptus tortus 
Proleptus trygonorrhinae

References

Nematodes